Linus Obexer (born 5 June 1997) is a Swiss professional footballer who plays as a left-back for Lausanne Ouchy in the Swiss Challenge League.

Club career
Obexer is a youth product from BSC Young Boys. He made his Swiss Super League debut on 12 May 2016 against FC St. Gallen

On 9 October 2020, he joined FC Vaduz on loan. On 16 December 2020, Vaduz announced that the agreement was reached with Young Boys for a permanent transfer and Obexer signed a contract until 2023.

References

1997 births
Footballers from Bern
Living people
Swiss men's footballers
Switzerland youth international footballers
Association football fullbacks
BSC Young Boys players
Neuchâtel Xamax FCS players
FC Aarau players
FC Lugano players
FC Vaduz players
FC Stade Lausanne Ouchy players
Swiss Super League players
Swiss Challenge League players
Swiss expatriate footballers
Expatriate footballers in Liechtenstein
Swiss expatriate sportspeople in Liechtenstein